Metro-Goldwyn-Mayer Studios, Inc., also known as Metro-Goldwyn-Mayer Pictures and abbreviated as MGM, is an American film, television production, distribution and media company owned by Amazon through MGM Holdings, founded on April 17, 1924, and based in Beverly Hills, California.

MGM was formed by Marcus Loew by combining Metro Pictures, Goldwyn Pictures, and Louis B. Mayer Pictures into one company. It hired a number of well known actors as contract players—its slogan was "more stars than there are in heaven"—and soon became Hollywood's most prestigious film studio, producing popular musical films and winning many Academy Awards. MGM also owned film studios, movie lots, movie theaters and technical production facilities. Its most prosperous era, from 1926 to 1959, was bracketed by two productions of Ben Hur. After that, it divested itself of the Loews movie theater chain, and, in the 1960s, diversified into television production.

In 1969, Kirk Kerkorian bought 40% of MGM and dramatically changed the company. He hired new management, reduced the studio's output to about five films per year, and diversified its products, creating MGM Resorts International and a Las Vegas-based hotel and casino company (which it later divested in the 1980s). In 1980, the studio acquired United Artists. Kerkorian sold the entire company to Ted Turner in 1986, who kept the rights to the MGM library in Turner Entertainment, sold the studio lot in Culver City to Lorimar, and sold the remnants of MGM back to Kerkorian that year. After Kerkorian sold and reacquired the company again in the 1990s, he expanded MGM by purchasing Orion Pictures and the Samuel Goldwyn Company, including both of their film libraries. Finally, in 2004, Kerkorian sold the company to a consortium that included Sony Pictures.

In 2010, MGM filed for Chapter 11 bankruptcy protection and reorganization. After reorganization, it emerged from bankruptcy later that year under its creditors' ownership. Two former executives at Spyglass Entertainment, Gary Barber and Roger Birnbaum, became co-chairmen and co-CEOs of MGM's new holding company. After Barber's departure in 2020, the studio sought to be acquired by another company to pay its creditors.

In May 2021, Amazon acquired the studio for $8.45 billion; the deal closed in March 2022.

As of 2022, MGM is still producing and distributing feature films and television series. Its major film productions include the Rocky and James Bond franchises, and among its recent television productions is the series The Handmaid's Tale.

Overview
MGM was the last studio to convert to sound pictures—nonetheless, from the end of the silent film era through the late 1950s, it was the dominant motion picture studio in Hollywood. It was slow to respond to the changing legal, economic, and demographic nature of the motion picture industry during the 1950s and 1960s; and although its films often did well at the box office, it lost significant amounts of money throughout the 1960s. In 1966, MGM was sold to Canadian investor Edgar Bronfman Sr., whose son Edgar Jr. would later buy Universal Studios. Three years later, an increasingly unprofitable MGM was bought by Kirk Kerkorian, who slashed staff and production costs, forced the studio to produce low-quality, low-budget fare, and then ceased theatrical distribution in 1973. The studio continued to produce five to six films a year that were distributed through other studios, usually United Artists. Kerkorian did, however, commit to increased production and an expanded film library when he bought United Artists in 1981.

MGM ramped up internal production, as well as keeping production going at UA, which included the lucrative James Bond film franchise. It also incurred significant amounts of debt to increase production. The studio took on additional debt as a series of owners took charge in the 1980s and early 1990s. In 1986, Ted Turner bought MGM, but a few months later, sold the company back to Kerkorian to recoup massive debt, while keeping the library assets for himself. The series of deals left MGM even more heavily in debt. MGM was bought by Pathé Communications (led by Italian publishing magnate Giancarlo Parretti) in 1990, but Parretti lost control of Pathé and defaulted on the loans used to purchase the studio. The French banking conglomerate Crédit Lyonnais, the studio's major creditor, then took control of MGM. Even more deeply in debt, MGM was purchased by a joint venture between Kerkorian, producer Frank Mancuso, and Australia's Seven Network in 1996.

The debt load from these and subsequent business deals negatively affected MGM's ability to survive as an independent motion picture studio. After a bidding war which included Time Warner (the current parent of Turner Broadcasting) and General Electric (the owners of the NBC television network at the time), MGM was acquired on September 23, 2004, by a partnership consisting of Sony Corporation of America, Comcast, Texas Pacific Group (now TPG Capital, L.P.), Providence Equity Partners, and other investors.

After its bankruptcy in 2010, MGM reorganized, with its creditors' $4 billion debt transferred to ownership. MGM's creditors control MGM through MGM Holdings, a private company. New management of its film and television production divisions was installed. The creditors have since contracted Morgan Stanley and LionTree Advisors to explore a sale.

History

Founding and early years

In 1924, movie theater magnate Marcus Loew had a problem. He had bought Metro Pictures Corporation in 1919 for $3 million, to provide a steady supply of films for his large Loew's Theatres chain. However, he found that his new property only provided a lackluster assortment of films. Seeking to solve this problem, Loew purchased Goldwyn Pictures in 1924 for $5 million to improve the quality of the theatres' products. However, these purchases created a need for someone to oversee his new Hollywood operations, since longtime assistant Nicholas Schenck was needed in New York headquarters to oversee the 150 theaters. A solution came in the person of Louis B. Mayer, head of Louis B. Mayer Pictures. Loew bought the Mayer studio for $75,000. Loews Incorporated completed the merger of the Loews theater chain and  the three studios on April 17, 1924, celebrated with a fete on April 26, 1924. Mayer became head of the renamed Metro-Goldwyn-Mayer, with 24-year-old Irving Thalberg as head of production. Final approval over budgets and contracts rested with New York City-based Loews Inc., while production decisions rested with the production headquarters in Culver City.

MGM produced more than 100 feature films in its first two years. In 1925, MGM released the extravagant and successful Ben-Hur, taking a $4.7 million profit that year, its first full year. Also in 1925, MGM, Paramount Pictures and UFA formed a joint German distributor, Parufamet.

Marcus Loew died in 1927, and control of Loew's passed to Nicholas Schenck. In 1929, William Fox of Fox Film Corporation bought the Loew family's holdings with Schenck's assent. Mayer and Thalberg disagreed with the decision. Mayer was active in the California Republican Party and used his political connections to persuade the Justice Department to delay final approval of the deal on antitrust grounds. During this time, in the summer of 1929, Fox was badly hurt in an automobile accident. By the time he recovered, the stock market crash in the fall of 1929 had nearly wiped Fox out and ended any chance of the Loew's merger going through. Schenck and Mayer had never gotten along (Mayer reportedly referred to his boss as "Mr. Skunk"), and the abortive Fox merger increased the animosity between the two men.

1920s and 1930s

From the outset, MGM tapped into the audience's need for glamor and sophistication. Having inherited few big names from their predecessor companies, Mayer and Thalberg began at once to create and publicize a host of new stars, among them Greta Garbo, John Gilbert, William Haines, Joan Crawford, and Norma Shearer (who followed Thalberg from Universal). Established names like Lon Chaney, William Powell, Buster Keaton, and Wallace Beery were hired from other studios. They also hired top directors such as King Vidor, Clarence Brown, Erich von Stroheim, Tod Browning, and Victor Seastrom. The arrival of talking pictures in 1928–29 gave opportunities to other new stars, many of whom would carry MGM through the 1930s: Clark Gable, Jean Harlow, Robert Montgomery, Spencer Tracy, Myrna Loy, Jeanette MacDonald, and Nelson Eddy among them.

MGM was one of the first studios to experiment with filming in Technicolor. Using the two-color Technicolor process then available, MGM filmed portions of The Uninvited Guest (1924), The Big Parade (1925), and Ben–Hur (1925), among others, in the process. MGM released The Viking (1928), the first complete Technicolor feature with a synchronized score and sound effects, but no spoken dialogue.

With the arrival of "talkies", MGM moved slowly and reluctantly into the sound era, releasing features like White Shadows in the South Seas (1928) with music and sound effects, and Alias Jimmy Valentine (1928) with limited dialogue sequences. Their first full-fledged talkie, the musical The Broadway Melody (1929), however, was both a box-office success and won the Academy Award as Best Picture of the Year.

MGM, was the last major studio to convert to sound. Its first all-color, "all-talking" sound feature with dialogue was the musical The Rogue Song in 1930. MGM included a sequence made in Technicolor's superior new three-color process, a musical number in the otherwise black-and-white The Cat and the Fiddle (1934), starring Jeanette MacDonald and Ramon Novarro. The studio then produced a number of three-color short subjects including the musical La Fiesta de Santa Barbara (1935); their first complete feature in the process was Sweethearts (1938) with MacDonald and Nelson Eddy, the earlier of the popular singing team's two films in color. From then on, MGM regularly produced several films a year in Technicolor with Northwest Passage (1939) being one of the most notable.

In addition to a large short-subjects program of its own, MGM also distributed the shorts and features produced by Hal Roach Studios, including comedy shorts starring Laurel and Hardy, Our Gang and Charley Chase. The studio's distribution deal with Roach lasted from 1927 to 1938, and MGM benefited in particular from the success of the popular Laurel and Hardy films. In 1938, MGM purchased the rights to the Our Gang series and moved production to MGM studios, continuing production of the successful series of children's comedies until 1944. From 1929 to 1931, MGM produced a series of comedy shorts called All Barkie Dogville Comedies, in which trained dogs were dressed up to parody contemporary films and were voiced by actors. One of the shorts, The Dogway Melody (1930), spoofed MGM's hit 1929 musical The Broadway Melody.

MGM entered the music industry by purchasing the "Big Three" starting with Miller Music Publishing Co. in 1934 then Robbins Music Corporation. In 1935, MGM acquired a controlling interest in the capital stock of Leo Feist, Inc., the last of the "Big Three". During the first musical craze of 1928–1930, a custom MGM label was created by Columbia using tunes from MGM productions that were recorded by Columbia. These records were sold only at Loew's theaters. (Columbia also created a label called Publix for Paramount music and sold only at Paramount Theaters.)

MGM produced approximately 50 pictures a year, though it never met its goal of releasing a new motion picture each and every week (it was only able to release one feature film every nine days). Loew's 153 theaters were mostly located in New York, the Northeast, and Deep South; Gone with the Wind (1939) had its world premiere at Loew's Grand Theatre in Atlanta, Georgia. A fine reputation was gained for lavish productions that were sophisticated and polished to cater to an urban audience. Still, as the Great Depression deepened, MGM began to economize by "recycling" existing sets, costumes, and furnishings from yesteryear projects. This recycling practice never let up once started. In addition, MGM saved money because it was the only one of the big five studios that did not own an off-site movie ranch. Until the mid-1950s, MGM could make a claim its rivals could not: the studio never lost money, although it did produce an occasional disaster such as  Parnell (1937), Clark Gable's biggest flop. MGM was the only Hollywood studio that continued to pay dividends during the 1930s.

MGM stars dominated the box office during the 1930s, and the studio was credited for inventing the Hollywood stable of stars system, as well. MGM contracted with the American Musical Academy of Arts Association to handle all of their press and artist development. The AMAAA's main function was to develop the budding stars and to make them appealing to the public. Stars such as Norma Shearer, Joan Crawford, Greta Garbo, Myrna Loy and Jeanette MacDonald reigned as the top-paid figures at the studio. Another MGM actress of the era, Jean Harlow, who had previously appeared in the Howard Hughes film Hell's Angels (1930), now had a big break and became a Hollywood sex symbol and one of MGM's most admired stars, as well. Despite Harlow's gain, Garbo was arguably the biggest star for MGM. Shearer was still a money maker despite her screen appearances becoming scarce, and Crawford continued her box-office popularity until 1937. MGM also received a boost through the man who would become known as "King of Hollywood", Clark Gable. Gable's career took off to new heights after he won an Oscar for the Columbia film It Happened One Night (1934).

Mayer and Irving Thalberg's association began warmly, but eventually relations between the two became strained; Thalberg preferred literary works and expensive costume pictures over the lower budget, family-oriented crowd-pleasers Mayer wanted. Thalberg, always physically frail, was removed as head of production in 1932. Mayer encouraged other staff producers, among them his son-in-law David O. Selznick, but no one seemed to have the sure touch of Thalberg. As Thalberg's health deteriorated in 1936, Mayer could now serve as his temporary replacement. Rumors had begun circulating for some time that Thalberg was leaving MGM to set up his own independent company; his premature death at age 37 in September 1936 cost MGM dearly.

After Thalberg's untimely death, Mayer became head of production, as well as studio chief, becoming the first million-dollar executive in American history. The company remained profitable, and an increase in MGM's "series" pictures (Andy Hardy starring Mickey Rooney, Maisie starring Ann Sothern, The Thin Man starring William Powell and Myrna Loy,  and  Dr. Kildare/ Dr. Gillespie with Lew Ayres and Lionel Barrymore) is cited as evidence of Mayer's restored influence. Also playing a huge role was Ida Koverman, Mayer's secretary and right hand.

In 1937, Mayer hired Mervyn LeRoy, a former Warner Bros. ( producer/director as MGM's top producer and Thalberg's replacement. LeRoy convinced Mayer to acquire the film rights to the popular children's book The Wonderful Wizard of Oz; MGM purchased the rights from Samuel Goldwyn for $75,000 in 1938.

MGM's hits in 1939 included The Wizard of Oz, Ninotchka, starring Greta Garbo, The Women, starring Joan Crawford and Norma Shearer and Gone with the Wind, starring Vivien Leigh as Scarlett O'Hara and Clark Gable as Rhett Butler. Although Gone With the Wind was produced by Selznick International Pictures, the film was distributed by MGM as part of a deal for producer David O. Selznick, Mayer's son-in-law, to obtain the services of Gable as well as financial assistance necessary for Selznick to complete the film. While The Wizard of Oz was a critical hit, the production costs for the film were so expensive, it took 20 years before it turned a profit.

1940s
Within one year, beginning in 1942, Mayer released his five highest-paid actresses from their studio contracts: Joan Crawford, Greta Garbo, Norma Shearer, Myrna Loy and Jeanette MacDonald. After being labeled "box office poison", Crawford's MGM contract was terminated and she moved to Warner Brothers, where her career took a dramatic upturn. Garbo and Shearer never made another film after leaving the lot. Of the five stars, Loy and MacDonald were the only two whom Mayer later rehired, in 1947 and 1948 respectively; Crawford returned to MGM after Mayer's departure for the musical drama Torch Song in 1953.

Increasingly, before and during World War II, Mayer came to rely on his "College of Cardinals"—senior producers who controlled the studio's output. This management-by-committee resulted in MGM losing its momentum, developing few new stars, and relying on the safety of sequels and bland material. (Dorothy Parker memorably referred to the studio as "Metro-Goldwyn-Merde".) Production values remained high, and even "B" pictures carried a polish and gloss that made them expensive to mount. After 1940, production was cut from 50 pictures a year to a more manageable 25 features per year. During this period, MGM released several very successful musicals with stars such as Judy Garland, Fred Astaire, Gene Kelly, and Frank Sinatra.

1950s
Audiences began drifting to television in the late 1940s, and MGM and the other studios were finding it increasingly difficult to attract them to theaters. With its high overhead expenses, MGM's profit margins continued to decrease. Word came from Nicholas Schenck in New York to find "a new Thalberg" who could improve quality while paring costs. Mayer thought he had found this savior in Dore Schary, a writer and producer who had found success at running RKO Pictures. Lavish musicals were Schary's focus, with hits like Easter Parade (1948) and the popular films of Mario Lanza (most famously, The Great Caruso (1951))  helped keep MGM profitable.

In August 1951, Mayer was fired by MGM's East Coast executives and he was replaced by Schary. Gradually cutting loose expensive contract players (including $6,000-a-week Judy Garland in 1950 and "King of Hollywood" Clark Gable in 1954), saving money by recycling existing movie sets instead of building costly new scenery, and reworking expensive old costumes, Schary managed to keep the studio running much as it had through the early 1940s though his sensibilities for hard-edged, message movies would never bear much fruit. One bright spot was MGM musical pictures, under the aegis of producer Arthur Freed, who was operating what amounted to an independent unit within the studio. MGM produced some well-regarded and profitable musicals that would later be acknowledged as classics, among them An American in Paris (1951), Singin' in the Rain (1952), and Seven Brides for Seven Brothers (1954). However, Brigadoon (1954), Deep in My Heart (1954), It's Always Fair Weather (1955), Invitation to the Dance (1956) and Les Girls (1957) were extravagant song and dance flops, and even the now-classic The Band Wagon (1953) and Silk Stockings (1957) lost money upon their initial release.

In 1952, as a settlement of the government's restraint-of-trade action, United States v. Paramount Pictures, Inc. 334 US 131 (1948), Loews, Inc. gave up control of MGM. It would take another five years before the interlocking arrangements were completely undone, by which time both Loews and MGM were losing money. In 1956, Schary was ousted from MGM in another power struggle against the New York-based executives. Cost overruns and the failure of the big-budget epic Raintree County (1957) prompted the studio to terminate Schary's contract.

Schary's reign at MGM had been marked with few legitimate hits, but his departure (along with the retirement of Schenck in 1955) left a power vacuum that would prove difficult to fill. Initially Joseph Vogel became president and Sol Siegel head of production. In 1957 (by coincidence, the year Mayer died), the studio lost money for the first time in its 34-year history. By 1960, MGM had released the last of its contract players, with many either retiring or moving on to television.

In 1958, MGM released what is generally considered its last great musical, Arthur Freed's Cinemascope color production of Gigi, starring Leslie Caron, Maurice Chevalier, and Louis Jourdan. It was adapted from the novel by Colette, and written by the team of Lerner and Loewe, who also wrote My Fair Lady and Camelot. Gigi was a box-office and critical success which won nine Academy Awards, including Best Picture. From it came several hit songs, including "Thank Heaven For Little Girls", "I Remember It Well", the "Waltz at Maxim's", and the Oscar-winning title song. The film was the last MGM musical to win a Best Picture Oscar, an honor that had previously gone to The Broadway Melody (1929), The Great Ziegfeld (1936), and An American in Paris (1951). The last musical film produced by the "Freed Unit" was an adaptation of the Broadway musical Bells Are Ringing (1960) with Judy Holliday and Dean Martin. However, MGM did release later musical films, including an adaptation of Meredith Willson's The Unsinkable Molly Brown (1964) with Debbie Reynolds and Harve Presnell.

MGM enters television
MGM's first television program, The MGM Parade, was produced by MGM's trailer department as one of the compilation and promotional shows that imitated Disney's series Disneyland which was also on ABC. Parade was canceled by ABC in the 2nd quarter of 1956. MGM took bids for its movie library in 1956 from Lou Chesler and others, but decided on entering the TV market itself. Chesler had offered $50 million for the film library. MGM Television was started with the hiring of Bud Barry to head up the operation in June 1956. MGM Television was to distribute its films to TV (starting with the networks), TV production and purchasing TV stations. TV production was expected to start with the 1957–58 season and was to include half-hour remakes of, or series based on, its pictures. Initial feature film sales focused on selling to the networks.

The year 1957 also marked the end of MGM's animation department, as the studio determined it could generate the same amount of revenue by reissuing older cartoons as it could by producing and releasing new ones. William Hanna and Joseph Barbera, by then the heads of the MGM cartoon studio, took most of their unit and made their own company, Hanna-Barbera Productions, a successful producer of television animation.

In 1956, MGM sold the television rights for The Wizard of Oz to CBS, which scheduled it to be shown in November of that year. In a landmark event, the film became the first American theatrical fiction film to be shown complete in one evening on prime time television over a major American commercial network. (Olivier's version of Hamlet was shown on prime time network TV a month later, but split in half over two weeks, and the 1950 film, The Titan: Story of Michelangelo was telecast by ABC in 1952, but that was a documentary.) Beginning in 1959, and lasting until 1991, telecasts of The Wizard of Oz became an annual tradition, drawing huge audiences in homes all over the U.S. and earning additional profits for MGM. The studio was all too happy to see Oz become, through television, one of the two or three most famous films MGM has ever made, and one of the few films that nearly everybody in the U.S. has seen at least once. Today The Wizard of Oz is regularly shown on the Turner-owned channels, no longer just once a year.

MGM cartoons

In animation, MGM purchased the rights in 1930 to distribute a series of cartoons that starred a character named Flip the Frog, produced by Ub Iwerks. The first cartoon in this series (entitled Fiddlesticks) was the first sound cartoon to be produced in two-color Technicolor. In 1933, Ub Iwerks canceled the unsuccessful Flip the Frog series and MGM began to distribute its second series of cartoons, starring a character named Willie Whopper, that was also produced by Ub Iwerks.

In 1934, after Iwerks' distribution contract expired, MGM contracted with animation producers/directors Hugh Harman and Rudolph Ising to produce a new series of color cartoons. Harman and Ising came to MGM after breaking ties with Leon Schlesinger and Warner Bros. and brought with them their popular Looney Tunes character, Bosko. These were known as Happy Harmonies, and in many ways resembled the Looney Tunes sister series, Merrie Melodies. The Happy Harmonies regularly ran over budget, and MGM dismissed Harman-Ising in 1937 to start its own animation studio.

After initial struggles with a poorly received series of The Captain and the Kids cartoons, the studio rehired Harman and Ising in 1939, and Ising created the studio's first successful animated character, Barney Bear. However, MGM's biggest cartoon stars would come in the form of the cat-and-mouse duo Tom and Jerry, created by William Hanna and Joseph Barbera in 1940. The Tom and Jerry cartoons won seven Academy Awards between 1943 and 1953. In 1941, Tex Avery, another Schlesinger alumnus, joined the animation department. Avery gave the unit its image, with successes like Red Hot Riding Hood, Swing Shift Cinderella, and the Droopy series.

Avery left the studio in 1953, leaving Hanna and Barbera to focus on the popular Tom and Jerry and Droopy series. After 1955, all cartoons were filmed in CinemaScope until MGM closed its cartoon division in 1957.

In 1961, MGM resumed the release of new Tom and Jerry shorts, and production moved to Rembrandt Films in Prague, Czechoslovakia (now the Czech Republic) under the supervision of Gene Deitch, who had been hired away from Terrytoons. Although Deitch's Tom and Jerry cartoons were considered to be vastly inferior to the earlier Hanna and Barbera shorts, they did receive positive reviews in some quarters. In 1963, the production of Tom and Jerry returned to Hollywood under Chuck Jones and his Sib Tower 12 Productions studio (later absorbed by MGM and renamed MGM Animation/Visual Arts). Jones' group also produced its own works, winning an Oscar for The Dot and the Line (1965), as well as producing the classic television version of Dr. Seuss's How the Grinch Stole Christmas! (1966) featuring the voice of Boris Karloff. Tom and Jerry folded in 1967, and the animation department continued with television specials and one feature film, The Phantom Tollbooth. A revived Metro-Goldwyn-Mayer Animation was in existence from 1993 to 1999.

Metro-Goldwyn-Mayer Inc.

MGM in the 1960s
In 1959, MGM enjoyed what is quite probably its greatest financial success of later years, with the release of its nearly four-hour Technicolor epic Ben–Hur, a remake of its 1925 silent film hit, loosely based on the novel by General Lew Wallace. Starring Charlton Heston in the title role, the film was critically acclaimed, and won 11 Academy Awards, including Best Picture, a record that held until Titanic matched it in 1997 and The Lord of the Rings: The Return of the King also did in 2003.

During this period, MGM fell into a practice that eventually nearly doomed the studio: an entire year's production schedule relied on the success of one big-budget epic film each year. This policy began in 1959, when Ben–Hur was profitable enough to carry the studio through 1960. However, four succeeding big-budget epics—like Ben–Hur, each a remake—failed: Cimarron (1960), King of Kings (1961), Four Horsemen of the Apocalypse (1961), and, most notoriously, Mutiny on the Bounty (1962). The Cinerama film The Wonderful World of the Brothers Grimm (also 1962), the first film in Cinerama to actually tell a story, was also a financial failure. But one other big-budget epic that was a success, however, was the MGM-Cinerama co-production How the West Was Won (1962), with a huge all-star cast. King of Kings, while a commercial and critical bomb at the time, has since come to be regarded as a film classic. The losses caused by these films led to the resignations of Sol Siegel and Joseph Vogel who were replaced by Robert M. Weitman (head of production) and Robert O'Brien (president).

The combination of O'Brien and Weitman seemed to temporarily revive the studio. MGM released David Lean's immensely popular Doctor Zhivago (1965), later followed by such hits as The Dirty Dozen (1967) and 2001: A Space Odyssey (1968). However the company's time was taken up fighting off proxy attacks by corporate raiders, and then MGM backed another series of box office failures, including the musical remake of Goodbye, Mr. Chips (1969) and Ryan's Daughter (1970). Weitman moved over to Columbia in 1967 and O'Brien was forced to resign a few years later.

In the mid-1960s, MGM began to diversify by investing in real estate. Edgar Bronfman Sr. purchased a controlling interest in MGM in 1966 (and was briefly chairman of the board in 1969), and in 1967 Time Inc. became the company's second-largest shareholder.

Kirk Kerkorian investment
In 1969, Kirk Kerkorian purchased 40 percent of MGM stock. What appealed to Kerkorian was MGM's asset value, which included subsidiary businesses, real estate, and the value of 45 years' worth of glamour associated with the name, which he attached to a Las Vegas hotel and casino. As for film-making, that part of the company was bleeding money and was quickly and severely downsized under the supervision of James T. Aubrey Jr. With changes in its business model including fewer pictures per year, more location shooting and more distribution of independent productions, MGM's operations were reduced. Aubrey sold off MGM's accumulation of props, furnishings and historical memorabilia, including a pair of Dorothy's ruby slippers from The Wizard of Oz. Lot 3,  of back-lot property, was sold off for real-estate development. In 1971, it was announced that MGM was in talks with 20th Century-Fox about a possible merger, a plan which never came into fruition. Under Aubrey, MGM also sold off MGM Records and its overseas theater holdings.

Through the 1970s, studio output slowed considerably as Aubrey preferred four or five medium-budget pictures each year along with a smattering of low-budget fare. In October 1973 and in decline in output, MGM closed its distribution offices then outsourced distribution for its library for a ten-year period along with selling its music publishing arm, Robbins, Feist & Miller plus half of Quality Records of Canada, to United Artists.

Kerkorian now distanced himself from the operations of the studio, focusing on MGM Grand Hotel by investing $120 million. Another portion of the backlot was sold in 1974. The last shooting done on the backlot was the introductory material for That's Entertainment! (1974), a retrospective documentary that became a surprise hit for the studio.

That's Entertainment! was authorized by Dan Melnick, who was appointed head of production in 1972. Under Melnick's regime, MGM released a number of successful films in the 1970s, including Westworld (1973), Soylent Green (1973), The Sunshine Boys (1975), and Network (1976), which the studio co-produced with United Artists. Despute these successes, MGM never reclaimed its former status.

The MGM Recording Studios were sold in 1975. In 1979, Kerkorian declared that MGM was now primarily a hotel company. The company hit a symbolic low point in 1980 when David Begelman, earlier let go by Columbia following the discovery of his acts of forgery and embezzlement, was installed as MGM's president and CEO.

In 1980, Metro-Goldwyn-Mayer, Inc. split its production and casino units into separate companies: Metro-Goldwyn-Mayer Film Co. and MGM Grand Hotels, Inc. The rise of ancillary markets was enough to allow MGM to increase production to 10-15 films a year compared to three to six in the previous decade, but first it needed to restore its distribution unit.

MGM/UA Entertainment
MGM proceeded to return to theatrical distribution in 1981 with its purchase of United Artists, as UA's parent company Transamerica Corporation decided to jettison the studio following the huge financial debacle of Heaven's Gate (1980). after this acquisition, Metro-Goldwyn-Mayer Film Co. was renamed "MGM/UA Entertainment Company". MGM/UA sold its music publishing division to CBS Songs in 1983 with a five-year co-publishing agreement. In 1981, Fred Silverman and George Reeves via InterMedia Entertainment struck a deal with the studio to produce films and TV shows. In 1982, the company entered into a relationship with mini-major studio and film distributor The Cannon Group, Inc. whereas Cannon became part of the MGM/UA sub-distribution network, but in 1983, MGM/UA and Cannon entered a deal that MGM/UA had to distribute all future Cannon films in the North American region.

WarGames (1983) and Octopussy (1983) were both hits for MGM/UA, but did not push MGM into the profit range that Kerkorian wanted. MGM/UA formed a trio of subsidiaries, the MGM/UA Home Entertainment Group, MGM/UA Classics, and the MGM/UA Television Group in 1982. Kerkorian offered to purchase the remaining outstanding MGM shares he did not own to take the company private but was met with resistance.

After the purchase of UA, David Begelman's duties were transferred to that unit. Under Begelman, MGM/UA produced a number of unsuccessful films, and he was fired in July 1982. Out of the 11 films he put into production, only one film, Poltergeist (1982), proved to be a clear hit during his tenure with the studio. Not even MGM's greatest asset – its library – was enough to keep the studio afloat. After 1982, the studio relied more on distribution, picking up independent productions, rather than financing its own projects. In 1984, the company had signed an eight-picture agreement with Dino De Laurentiis, with a production value of $150 million, and MGM/UA had domestic distribution for eight of the future Dino De Laurentiis film productions. In 1985, MGM/UA Entertainment Co. had signed an agreement to distribute all specialized pictures produced by PSM Entertainment, with the first release going for 1986.

MGM Entertainment

On August 7, 1985, Turner Broadcasting System offered to buy MGM/UA. As film licensing to television became more complicated, Ted Turner saw the value of acquiring MGM's film library for his Superstation WTBS. Ahead of the merger, MGM/UA Distribution Co. become the newly minted joint venture UA/MGM Distribution Co., which would handle sales and operations of MGM and United Artists feature films. On March 25 of the following year, the deal was finalized in a cash-stock deal for $1.5 billion, and the company was renamed "MGM Entertainment Co.". Turner immediately sold MGM's United Artists subsidiary back to Kerkorian for roughly $480 million. But since Turner was unable to find financing for the rest of the deal because of concerns in the financial community over the debt-load of his companies, on August 26, 1986, Turner was forced to sell MGM's production and distribution assets to United Artists for $300 million. The MGM studio lot and lab facilities were sold to Lorimar-Telepictures. Lorimar-Telepictures would later sell the Metrocolor facilities, Metrocolor Film Laboratory (aka MGM Laboratory) to Technicolor for $60 million. Turner retained the pre-May 1986 library of MGM films, along with the RKO Radio Pictures and pre-1950 Warner Bros. films which United Artists had previously purchased.

How much of MGM's back catalog Turner actually obtained was a point of conflict for a time; eventually, it was determined that Turner owned all of the pre-May 1986 MGM library, as well as the pre-1950 Warner Bros. catalog, the Popeye cartoons released by Paramount (both the pre-1950 WB library and Popeye cartoons were sold to Associated Artists Productions, which was later bought by United Artists), and the US/Canadian rights to the RKO library, in addition to MGM's television series. Turner used the acquired films to launch the new cable channel Turner Network Television.

MGM/UA Communications
After Kerkorian reclaimed MGM in August 1986, the MGM/UA name continued to be used, but the company changed its name, this time to MGM/UA Communications Co., which was renamed from United Artists Corporation, now using MGM and UA as separate brands. The change became official on September 10, 1986, and at that time, the New York Stock Exchange ticker symbol was changed from UA, yet again to MGM. In 1987, both MGM/UA Communications Co., Paramount Pictures and Universal Pictures teamed up in order to market feature film and television product to China, and the consumer reach is measured in terms of the 25-billion admission tickets that were clocked in China in 1986, and Worldwide Media Sales, a division of the New York-based Worldwide Media Group had been placed in charge of the undertaking. Later that year, in October 1987, MGM/UA had two separate financing deals with Star Partners Ltd., which is planning on to raise $65 million in debt to co-finance the upcoming pictures made by MGM/UA, and a second financing agreement was obtained by First Artist Media Entertainment Ltd., which is planning on to raise $15 million to co-finance, produce and distribute several low-budget pictures that were planning on to be produced by MGM/UA.

In July 1988, Kerkorian announced plans to split MGM and UA into separate studios. Under this deal, Kerkorian, who owned 82% of MGM/UA Communications, would have sold 25% of MGM to Barris Industries (controlled by producers Burt Sugarman, Jon Peters, and Peter Guber). The proposition to spin off MGM was called off a few weeks later. In 1989, Australian-based Qintex attempted to buy MGM from Kerkorian, but the deal collapsed. On November 29, 1989, Turner (owners of the pre-May 1986 MGM library) attempted to buy Tracinda's entertainment assets such as MGM/UA Communications Co. but every time the deal had failed.

MGM-Pathé Communications

In 1990, Italian financier Giancarlo Parretti announced he was about to buy MGM/UA. Although the French government had scuttled Parretti's bid to buy Pathé due to concerns about his character, background, and past dealings, Parretti gained backing from Crédit Lyonnais and bought MGM/UA from Kirk Kerkorian. To finance the purchase, Parretti licensed the MGM/UA library to Time Warner for home video and Turner for domestic television rights until 2003. He then merged it with his Pathé Communications Corporation (formerly Cannon Group, a distributor that Parretti had renamed before his aborted bid for Pathé) to form MGM–Pathe Communications Co. The well-respected executive, Alan Ladd Jr., a former president of MGM/UA, was brought on board as CEO of MGM in 1991. However, a year later, Parretti's ownership of MGM–Pathé dissolved in a flurry of lawsuits and a default by Crédit Lyonnais, and Parretti faced securities-fraud charges in the United States and Europe.

On the verge of bankruptcy and failure, Crédit Lyonnais took full control of MGM–Pathé via loan default in mid-1992 and converted its name back to Metro-Goldwyn-Mayer. The bank fired Ladd and replaced him with former Paramount executive Frank Mancuso Sr. Mancuso then hired Michael Marcus as chairman, MGM Pictures and former Warner Bros. executive John Calley as United Artists head. A television production division was started up. As part of his exit package, Ladd took some of the top properties, including Braveheart.

On December 21, 1992, MGM's 15% investment ($30 million in cash) in Carolco Pictures plus a $30 million convertible note was approved by Carolco's board. MGM also started distributing Carolco's films in January 1994 after its deal with TriStar Pictures ended. While MGM had to convince parent Credit Lyonnais to allow the deal, Lyonnais was Carolco's main lender thus allowing the bank to collect outstanding debts and extend a new line of credit.

MGM Holdings, Inc. was formed to take on about $1 billion in MGM's liabilities off MGM's balance sheet in the third quarter of 1993. Credit Lyonnais extended a $400 million line of credit allowing a Chemical Bank lead bank group to extend a $350 million line of credit in 1994. In 1994, MGM had a hit in Stargate.

In May 1995, MGM agreed to distribute four of Rysher Entertainment's films in 1996 and 1997 and co-produce and co-finance two or three in that same period.

Metro-Goldwyn-Mayer Pictures
Because of the way it had acquired control of the company, Crédit Lyonnais soon put the studio up for sale, with the highest bidder being Kirk Kerkorian. Now the owner of MGM for the third time, Kerkorian's deal with Mancuso quickly angered John Calley, who quit United Artists and was named head of Sony Pictures Entertainment. By selling a portion of the studio to Australia's Seven Network, Kerkorian was able to convince Wall Street that a revived MGM was worthy of a place on the stock market, where it languished until he sold the company to a group of hedge funds tied to Sony, which wanted to control the studio library to promote the Blu-ray Disc format.

On April 11, 1997, MGM bought Metromedia's film subsidiaries (Orion Pictures, The Samuel Goldwyn Company, and the Motion Picture Corporation of America) for US$573 million, substantially enlarging its library of films and television series and acquiring additional production capacity. The deal closed in July of that year. This catalog, along with the James Bond franchise, was considered to be MGM's primary asset. In the same year, MGM's long-running cable television series, Stargate SG-1, first aired. Kerkorian bought out Seven Network the following year. That year, MGM and Danjaq, LLC received a lawsuit from Sony Pictures in order to do a rival Bond franchise backed by Kevin McClory. MGM had acquired the rights to the unofficial Bond production Never Say Never Again from Jack Schwartzman's estate in the December of that year.

In December 1997, MGM attempted to purchase 1,000 films (referred to as the Epic film library) held by Consortium de Réalisation, but was outbid by PolyGram. However, they ultimately succeeded when they acquired the 2/3 of pre-1996 PolyGram Filmed Entertainment library from Seagram in 1999 for $250 million, increasing their library holdings to 4000. Prior to that, MGM had held a home video license for 100 of the films since spring 1997. The PolyGram libraries were purchased by its Orion Pictures subsidiary so as to avoid its 1990 video distribution agreement with Warner. The studio also obtained the broadcast rights to more than 800 of its films previously licensed to Turner Broadcasting.

By 1998, MGM had started a specialty film unit using The Samuel Goldwyn Company under the Goldwyn Films name. Samuel Goldwyn Jr. sued Metromedia over salary and damages when he worked at Goldwyn Company under Metromedia and sued MGM over the use of the Goldwyn name claiming trademark infringement and unfair competition. MGM and Metromedia settled on January 10, 1999, with MGM's Goldwyn Films changing its name to G2 Films. In the middle of that year, MGM and Sony settled in an out-of-court lawsuit that saw MGM trading its Spider-Man film rights to Sony in exchange for having the rights to Casino Royale.

In 2000, MGM changed its overseas distribution arrangement. Since 1981, MGM had distributed its films internationally through United International Pictures (UIP), a joint venture of MGM, Universal Pictures, DreamWorks Pictures and Paramount Pictures. UIP was accused by the European Union of being an illegal cartel, and effective November 2000 MGM severed its ties with UIP and distributed films internationally through 20th Century Fox.

MGM purchased 20 percent of Rainbow Media Group from Cablevision Systems for $825 million in 2001. MGM attempted to take over Universal Studios in 2003, but failed, and was forced to sell several of its cable channel investments (taking a $75-million loss on the deal).

In January 2002, MGM formed the MGM Entertainment Business Group with lawyer Darcie Denkert as president. This placed her in charge of MGM on Stage, the company's theatrical arm. Her friend Dean Stolber joined her as co-president of the theatrical unit.

MGM Holdings

Bidding war and corporate reorganization
In 2002, Kerkorian put MGM up for sale again, with a suggested sale price of $7 billion. In 2004, many of MGM's competitors started to make bids to purchase the studio, beginning with Time Warner. It was not unexpected that Time Warner would bid, since the largest shareholder in the company was Ted Turner. His Turner Entertainment Group had risen to success in part through its ownership of the pre-May 1986 MGM library. After a short period of negotiations with MGM, Time Warner was unsuccessful. The leading bidder proved to be Sony Corporation of America, backed by Comcast and private equity firms Texas Pacific Group (now TPG Capital, L.P.), DLJ and Providence Equity Partners. Sony's primary goal was to ensure Blu-ray Disc support at MGM; cost synergies with Sony Pictures Entertainment were secondary. Time Warner made a counter-bid (which Ted Turner reportedly tried to block), but on September 13, 2004, Sony increased its bid of US$11.25 per share (roughly $4.7 billion) to $12 per share ($5 billion), and Time Warner subsequently withdrew its bid of $11 per share ($4.5 billion). MGM and Sony agreed on a purchase price of nearly $5 billion, of which about $2 billion was to pay off MGM's debt. From 2005 to 2006, the Columbia TriStar Motion Picture Group domestically distributed films by MGM and UA.

In 2006, MGM announced it would return as a theatrical distribution company. MGM struck deals with The Weinstein Company (TWC), Lakeshore Entertainment, Bauer Martinez, and many other independent studios, and then announced its plans to release 14 feature films for 2006 and early 2007. MGM also hoped to increase the amount to over 20 by 2007. Lucky Number Slevin, released April 7, was the first film released under the new MGM era. The TWC distribution agreement covered three years and got TWC films, but was ended three months early.

On May 31, 2006, MGM announced it would transfer the majority of its home video output from Sony Pictures Home Entertainment to 20th Century Fox Home Entertainment.

MGM also announced plans to restructure its worldwide television distribution operation. In addition, MGM signed a deal with New Line Television in which MGM would handle New Line's U.S. film and series television syndication packages. MGM served as New Line's barter sales representative in the television arena until 2008.

A tentative agreement was signed in Seoul on March 15, 2006, between MGM, South Korea-based entertainment agency Glovit and Busan city officials for a theme park scheduled to open in 2011. MGM Studio City was projected to cost $1.02 billion build on 245 acres owned by the city in a planned tourist district and contain 27 attractions, a film academy with movie sets, hotels, restaurants and shopping facilities. Glovit was expected to find funding and oversee management of the park, while MGM received a licensing agreement making them handle content and overall planning and the option to buy a 5%–10% share.

On November 2, 2006, producer/actor Tom Cruise and his production partner, Paula Wagner, signed an agreement with MGM to run United Artists. Wagner served as United Artists' chief executive.

MGM in the digital age
Over the next several years, MGM launched a number of initiatives in distribution and the use of new technology and media, as well as joint ventures to promote and sell its products. In April 2007, it was announced that MGM movies would be able to be downloaded through Apple's iTunes service, with MGM bringing an estimated 100 of its existing movies to iTunes service, the California-based computer company revealed. The list of movies included the likes of modern features such as Rocky, Ronin, Mad Max, and Dances with Wolves, along with more golden-era classics such as Lilies of the Field and The Great Train Robbery. In October, the company launched MGM HD on DirecTV, offering a library of movies formatted in Hi Def. Also in 2006, MGM licensed its home video distribution rights for countries outside of the United States to 20th Century Fox. MGM teamed up with Weigel Broadcasting to launch a new channel titled This TV on November 1, 2008. On August 12, 2008, MGM teamed up with Comcast to launch a new video-on-demand network titled Impact. On November 10, 2008, MGM announced that it will release full-length films on YouTube.

On April 14, 2008, a South Korea government agency announced that MGM and Incheon International Airport Corporation agreed to build MGM Studio Theme Park. The selected site was a 1.5 million square meter Yeongjongdo island property near the Incheon International Airport. However, the park was designed but never built.

MGM files for bankruptcy
As of mid-2009, MGM had US$3.7 billion in debt, and interest payments alone totaled $250 million a year. MGM was earning approximately $500 million a year on income from its extensive film and television library, but the economic recession is reported to have reduced this income substantially.

Whether MGM could avoid voluntary or involuntary bankruptcy had been a topic of much discussion in the film industry. MGM had to repay a $250-million line of credit in April 2010, a $1-billion loan in June 2011, and its remaining US$2.7 billion in loans in 2012. In May 2009, MGM's auditor gave the company a clean bill of health, concluding it was still on track to meet its debt obligations. At that time, the company was negotiating with its creditors to either extend the debt repayment deadlines or engage in a debt-for-equity swap. Industry observers, however, questioned whether MGM could avoid a Chapter-11 bankruptcy filing under any circumstances, and concluded that any failure to conclude the negotiations must trigger a filing. MGM and its United Artists subsidiary were now producing very few films each year, and it was widely believed that MGM's solvency would depend on the box-office performance of these films (especially Skyfall). There was some indication that Relativity Media and its financial backer, Elliott Associates (a hedge fund based in New York), had been acquiring MGM debt in an attempt to force the company into involuntary bankruptcy.

On August 17, 2009, chief executive officer Harry E. Sloan stepped down and MGM hired Stephen F. Cooper as its new CEO, a corporate executive who guided Enron through its post-2001 bankruptcy and oversaw the restructuring and growth of Krispy Kreme in 2005. Expectations were that Cooper was hired to act quickly on MGM's debt problems. On October 1, 2009, the studio's new leadership negotiated a forbearance agreement with its creditors under which interest payments due from September to November 2009 did not have to be paid until December 15, 2009.

MGM stated in February 2010 that the studio would likely be sold in the next four months, and that its latest film, Hot Tub Time Machine, might be one of the last four films to bear the MGM name. However, some stated that the company might continue as a label for new James Bond productions, as well as other movie properties culled from the MGM library.

MGM Holdings, Metro-Goldwyn-Mayer and 160 affiliates filed for Chapter 11 bankruptcy on November 3, 2010, with a prepackaged plan for exiting bankruptcy which led to MGM's creditors taking over the company. On December 20, 2010, MGM executives announced that the studio had emerged from bankruptcy. Spyglass Entertainment executives Gary Barber and Roger Birnbaum became co-Chairs and co-CEOs of the studio.

Post-bankruptcy era
On January 4, 2011, MGM and Weigel Broadcasting announced plans to distribute MeTV nationwide. On February 2, 2011, MGM named Jonathan Glickman to be the film president of MGM. Six days later, MGM was finalizing a distribution deal with Sony Pictures Entertainment to handle distribution of its 4,000 films and DVDs worldwide and on digital platforms, including the two upcoming Bond films: Skyfall and Spectre. There were four studios who were bidding on the Bond distribution rights: Paramount Pictures, Warner Bros. Pictures, 20th Century Fox, and Columbia Pictures. Paramount was the first studio who dropped out of the Bond bidding. The deal was finalized on April 13, 2011. Post-bankruptcy, MGM also co-financed SPE's The Girl with the Dragon Tattoo. 20th Century Fox's deal with MGM handling its library distribution worldwide was set to expire in September 2011. However, the deal was renewed and extended on April 14, 2011 and, after five years, was renewed and extended again on June 27, 2016. It was expired in June 2020.

MGM moved forward with several upcoming projects, including remakes of RoboCop and Poltergeist (the RoboCop and Poltergeist remakes were released in 2014 and 2015, respectively), and released their first post-bankruptcy film Zookeeper, which was co-distributed by Columbia Pictures on July 8, 2011. The new MGM, under Barber and Birnbaum's control, focuses on co-investing on films made by another party, which handle all distribution and marketing for the projects. MGM handles international television distribution rights for the new films as well as its library of existing titles and also retains its in-house production service. In separate 2011 deals, the rights to MGM's completed films Red Dawn and The Cabin in the Woods were dealt to FilmDistrict as well as Lionsgate Films, respectively.

On October 3, 2012, Birnbaum announced his intention to exit his role as an MGM executive and return to "hands-on" producing. He will remain with the studio to produce films on "an exclusive basis". In December 2012, Denkert retired as co-president of MGM on Stage after producing five Broadway and West End plays. In May 2014, MGM introduced The Works, a channel available in 31 percent of the country, including stations owned by Titan Broadcast Management.

In 2013, the Orion brand was revived as a television production label for a syndicated court show. The Orion Pictures name was extended in fourth quarter 2014 for smaller domestic and international video on demand and limited theatrical releases.

In March 2017, MGM announced a multi-year distribution deal with Annapurna Pictures for some international markets and including home entertainment, theatrical and television rights. Later on October 31, 2017, the two companies formed a US distribution joint venture called Mirror Releasing. However, this partnership will not be exclusive to all MGM films, as several of them will continue to be released through existing studio partners, such as Warner Bros. and Paramount. It also does not include newly relaunched Orion Pictures. On February 5, 2019, Annapurna and MGM rebranded and expanded their US distribution joint venture as United Artists Releasing, marking another revival of the United Artists brand, with the Orion Pictures distribution team and films joining the venture. The decision was made to coincide with the United Artists brand's 100th anniversary. MGM's films on DVD and Blu-ray would continue to be released by 20th Century Fox Home Entertainment until June 2020.

Following the Harvey Weinstein sexual abuse allegations in October 2017, MGM was listed as one of 22 potential buyers interested in acquiring The Weinstein Company. In October 2017, MGM's board renewed Gary Barber's contract as chairman and CEO until December 2022. In February 2018, Chris Brearton, the former media M&A attorney of Latham and Watkins, was appointed as chief operating officer. On March 19, 2018, MGM Holdings announced that Barber had been fired by the studio's board of directors. MGM gave no reason for his firing. For the interim, the company would be led by the newly formed "Office of the CEO".

In April 2019, MGM signed a two-year, first-look deal for films with Smokehouse Pictures, owned by George Clooney and Grant Heslov. The deal's first film is an unnamed John DeLorean film based on journalist Alex Pappademas’ Epic magazine article "Saint John", written by Keith Bunin and Clooney as director with a possibility of starring.

In April 2019, MGM made a multi-film non-exclusive creative partnership with AGBO Films to co-develop, co-produce and co-finance a slate from the MGM library. The deal includes a new film projects joint development fund with the first film under the deal to be a remake of The Thomas Crown Affair.

MGM agreed to a $100 million co-financing slate deal with Bron Creative in June 2019. The slate consisted of at least nine films including three Orion Pictures films.

MGM was the first studio to delay the film No Time to Die due to the COVID-19 pandemic. This was followed by an April 2020 layoff of 7% of employees.

A shuffle of top executives occurred in the first four months. Glickman left in January 2020 and replaced by Michael De Luca as chairman of the motion picture group. A motion picture group president, veteran executive and producer Pamela Abdy, was named in early April. Co-presidents of production Cassidy Lange, Adam Rosenberg left by May 1, 2020.

In May 2020, MGM made an investment, facilitated by its television group, in Audio Up podcast production studio, platform and network. Audio Up would also produce 5 podcasts per year for MGM and agreed to an exclusive first look for its works. Later that month, MGM agreed to a two-year film and television first-look development deal with Killer Films.

In 2013 and 2015, Starz Entertainment signed exclusive film licensing agreements with MGM for 585 movies and 176 television series. In August 2019, Starz found a film in the agreement on a streaming service which MGM agreed was under the agreement and had it pulled. Starz pressed them and MGM admitted in November that 244 films and television series were being shown on other platforms including Epix. MGM indicated that month that the license tracking system was fixed. Finding films on other platforms a month later, Starz found an additional 100 films on other platforms. With this seeming to diminish their channel's value to cable operators, Starz sued on May 4, 2020, to uncover all contract violations.

Amazon subsidiary (2021–present)
In December 2020, MGM began to explore a potential sale of the studio, with the COVID-19 pandemic and the domination of streaming platforms due to the closure of movie theaters as contributing factors. The company hired Morgan Stanley and LionTree Advisors to handle the process on behalf of the studio. On May 17, 2021, online retail and technology company Amazon entered negotiations to acquire the studio. The negotiations were made directly with MGM board chairman Kevin Ulrich whose Anchorage Capital Group is a major shareholder. On May 26, 2021, it was officially announced that MGM will be acquired by Amazon for $8.45 billion, subject to regulatory approvals and other routine closing conditions; with the studio continuing to operate as a label under Amazon's existing content arm, complementing Amazon Studios and Amazon Prime Video. On March 15, 2022, Amazon secured an unconditional European Union antitrust approval for its proposed acquisition of MGM.

On February 8, 2022, Paul Thomas Anderson's Licorice Pizza became the studio's first fully produced, marketed and distributed film to be nominated for the Academy Award for Best Picture in 33 years, after 1988's Rain Man. On March 17, Amazon finalized the merger. Later that day, Amazon Studios and Prime Video SVP Mike Hopkins revealed that Amazon will continue to partner with United Artists Releasing, which will remain in operation to release all future MGM titles theatrically on a "case-by-case basis," while "all MGM employees will join my organization." It was also revealed that Amazon had no plans to make changes to the studio's production slate and release schedules nor make all MGM content exclusive to Prime Video, providing some hope that the studio would operate autonomously from Amazon Studios. These plans are expected to not impact the future of the James Bond franchise and its creative team. Two town halls further detailing MGM's future post-merger took place on March 18, which included one for MGM employees and one for Amazon Studios/Prime Video employees. Both revealed the new interim reporting structure as part of Amazon's "phased integration plan", which would involve De Luca, Mark Burnett (Chairman of MGM Worldwide Television) and COO Chris Brearton reporting to Hopkins on behalf of the studio. On March 22, the studio made its first post-merger acquisition with Luca Guadagnino's Bones and All, for which the studio purchased the global distribution rights. On April 27, 2022, it was announced that De Luca and Abdy would leave the studio for Warner Bros. A few months later, in August, it was announced MGM and Warner Bros. had signed a multi-year pact to distribute MGM's titles internationally outside North America, both theatrically in international territories and on home video worldwide, beginning with Bones and All and Creed III. The deal however excludes the films Till, Women Talking, and the 26th James Bond film, which would be distributed by Universal Pictures, with whom MGM had an international distribution deal earlier. On November 30, 2022, it was announced that Jennifer Salke, head of Amazon Studios, will be given full control of MGM's film and television divisions, with Brearton stepping down as COO to become the Vice President of PVS Corporate Strategy for MGM+ and MGM Alternative Television.

On March 4, 2023, it was revealed that Amazon had shut down United Artists Releasing's operations and folded it into MGM, amid the decision to release Amazon Studios' Air into theaters instead of Prime Video amidst 2024 Oscar buzz. This made Creed III the first film released and distributed by MGM itself under the new parent company instead of UAR.

Headquarters
Since August 22, 2011, MGM's headquarters have been in Beverly Hills, California, where it rents space in a six-story office building. The  facility was originally built for the venerable William Morris talent agency, but had remained all but unoccupied because of the agency's merger with Endeavor Talent Agency in April 2009. MGM planned to house a private theater and a private outdoor patio in the building.

Prior to 2003, MGM's headquarters were in the Colorado Center in Santa Monica, California, occupying at least . In 2000, it announced it was moving its headquarters to a new building in Century City that was to be the first high-rise in Los Angeles to be completed in the 21st century. When the company agreed to be its lead tenant halfway through the building's design process, it became identified as MGM Tower, planned for a 2003 opening. When MGM moved into the lavishly appointed spaces devised by Alex Yemenidjian, former MGM chairperson and chief executive, Roger Vincent and Claudia Eller observed in the Los Angeles Times that "Yemenidjian spared no expense in building out the studio's space with such Las Vegas-style flourishes as towering marble pillars and a grand spiral staircase lined with a wall of awards."

Architect Scott Johnson designed the bottom third of the tower with extra-large floors so MGM executives could have outdoor decks. No expense seemed to be spared—from imported Italian marble for MGM's offices, to the company's exclusive use of a private garage, security checkpoint, and elevator bank, all to enable visiting celebrities discreet entry and exit. One of the tower's three screening rooms was a 100-seat theater on the ground floor (later taken over by International Creative Management in December 2010). The 14th-floor lobby housed the executive suites and a wall of Oscar statuettes for Academy Award-winning films. The street leading to the building's garage was renamed MGM Drive and a large MGM logo, illuminated at night, crowned the building. As of December 2010, MGM was renting  in MGM Tower at a cost of almost $5 per square foot per month.

Emerging from bankruptcy protection in 2010, MGM announced that it planned to move its headquarters to Beverly Hills as part of an effort to resolve almost $5 billion in debt, since the lease in Century City was not scheduled to expire until 2018. Vincent and Eller said that MGM's per-square-foot monthly rent would be far lower in the Beverly Hills building than in MGM Tower. Larry Kozmont, a real estate consultant not involved in the process, said, "It's a prudent move for them. Downsizing and relocating to a space that is still prominent but not overly ostentatious and burdened by expenses is fundamental for their survival." MGM vacated its namesake tower on August 19, 2011.

Leo logo and mottos

The studio's official motto, "Ars Gratia Artis", is a Latin phrase meaning "Art for art's sake". It was chosen by Howard Dietz, the studio's chief publicist. The studio's logo is a roaring lion surrounded by a ring of film inscribed with the studio's motto. The logo, which features Leo the Lion, was created by Dietz in 1916 for Goldwyn Pictures and updated in 1924 for MGM's use. Dietz based the logo on his alma mater's mascot, the Columbia University lion.  Originally silent, the sound of Leo the Lion's roar was added to films for the first time in August 1928.

In the 1930s and 1940s, the studio billed itself as having "more stars than there are in heaven", a reference to the large number of A-list movie stars under its contract. This second motto was also coined by Dietz and was first used in 1932.

On March 8, 2021, the studio unveiled a rebrand, centered on the "Ars Gratia Artis" motto, across its social media and marketing platforms, including a photorealistic CGI version of its Leo the Lion emblem and logo, also introducing a new print logo for television, digital, and film posters, phasing out the static MGM logo in favor of simply the company's initials, done in the company's longtime typeface. This was to make the studio's name more recognizable when viewed at a small size.

Film library

Turner Entertainment Co.
Following his brief ownership of the company in 1986, Ted Turner formed Turner Entertainment Co. as a holding company for the pre-May 1986 MGM film and television library and pre-1950 Warner Bros. film library which he retained. For several years after the sale, MGM continued to distribute home video releases of those films under license from Turner, though in 1990 it sold all of its home video distribution rights to Warner Bros. After Turner's holdings were purchased by Time Warner in 1996, the rights for the Turner-owned films were reassigned to Warner Home Video in 1999 when MGM ended their distribution deal with Warner Bros, though Turner Entertainment, as a subsidiary of Warner Bros. Discovery, remains the credited copyright holder.

Franchises

Highest-grossing films

Distribution
Domestically, MGM currently distributes its own films and others they acquire from third parties in-house, as well as films produced by the relaunches of both Orion Pictures and American International Pictures. They were previously distributed by United Artists Releasing, the former Mirror Releasing, from 2019 to 2023; Internationally, MGM's films are currently distributed by Warner Bros. Pictures, following a four-year deal with Universal Pictures mostly through United International Pictures, of which MGM is a former member (see below).

From 1924 to 1973 (worldwide) and 1981 to 2010 (domestically), MGM has theatrically distributed most of its movies entirely in-house, as well as those of United Artists after July 1981 and Orion Pictures after April 1997. In October 2017, seven years after shutting down their major distribution operations, MGM re-entered US theatrical distribution by launching an American joint venture with Annapurna Pictures that will share distribution financing between the two companies and release certain MGM and Annapurna films, beginning with the 2018 remake of Death Wish.

There were also periods when they outsourced distribution to other companies. From 1973 to 1981, United Artists released its films in North America while Cinema International Corporation released them overseas. In 1981, United Artists' international arm was combined by CIC to form United International Pictures. MGM's arrangement with that company lasted until 2000, when it made an arrangement with 20th Century Fox for international distribution. From 2005 to 2016, the Columbia TriStar Motion Picture Group (later Sony Pictures Entertainment Motion Picture Group) has distributed certain films. From 2006 to 2010, Alliance Films handled Canadian distribution of some of its products. Since 2019, Universal Pictures International distributed MGM films overseas.

They also distributed films from Carolco Pictures (1994–1995, in North America), Rysher Entertainment (1996–1997), and The Weinstein Company/Dimension Films (2006–2008, in the United States), as well as currently handling select international distribution of Annapurna Pictures' releases.

From 2006 to September 2008, MGM distributed films produced or acquired by The Weinstein Company (TWC). Weinstein preferred the deal brought carriage on Showtime. Prints and marketing were paid for by TWC, while MGM was paid for booking theaters. With TWC agreeing to a direct deal with Showtime and MGM not intending to renew the distribution deal, TWC and MGM agreed to end the distribution deal three months early in September 2008.

Other international arrangements
In 2012, MGM signed a deal with Forum Film to release its films in Poland, Hungary, Romania, Bulgaria and Israel; Forum Film has also been known to release some of MGM's films in Czech Republic/Slovakia. That same year, in Denmark, Sweden and Norway, MGM arranged to get its films distributed through AB Svensk Filmindustri, which was renamed to SF Studios in 2016. Also in 2012, it arranged to have its films distributed by FS Film (now SF Film Finland) to release its films in Finland and with ZON Lusomundo (now NOS Audiovisuais) to release its films in Portugal.

In 2018, for select films, MGM made international distribution deals with Entertainment One (for the Canadian market), Vertigo Releasing (for the UK market), Rialto Distribution (for the Australian market), Ascot Elite Entertainment Group (for the Swiss market), BF Distribution (for the Argentinean market), Dutch FilmWorks (for the Dutch market), Kinepolis Film Distribution (for the Belgian film market), Odeon (for the Greek market), OctoArts Films (for the Filipino market), Universum Film (for the German market), Filmax International (for the Spanish market), Hollywood International Film Exchange/Big Screen Entertainment Group (for the Chinese market), Shaw Organisation (for the Singaporean market), and Showgate (for the Japanese market). Paramount Pictures distributed the 2018 remake of Death Wish for the French market.

See also

 List of libraries owned by Metro-Goldwyn-Mayer
 List of MGM Television programs

Notes

References

Bibliography

Further reading

External links

 
 , held by the Billy Rose Theatre Division, 
 

 
1924 establishments in California
Academy Award for Technical Achievement winners
Amazon (company) acquisitions
American companies established in 1924
American film studios
Articles containing video clips
Cinema of Southern California
Companies based in Beverly Hills, California
Companies based in Culver City, California
Companies based in Los Angeles
Companies that filed for Chapter 11 bankruptcy in 2010
Entertainment companies based in California
Film distributors of the United States
Film production companies of the United States
Culture of Hollywood, Los Angeles
Mass media companies established in 1924
Organizations awarded an Academy Honorary Award
Recipients of the Scientific and Technical Academy Award of Merit